Afife Jale (1902 – July 24, 1941) was a Turkish stage actress, best known as the first Muslim theatre actress in Turkey.

Career
Afife was studying at the Girls Industry School in Istanbul; however, she wanted to be an actress. In the Ottoman Empire, Muslim Turkish women were not allowed to play on stage by a decree of the Ministry of the Interior. Only non-Muslim women of Greek, Armenian, or Jewish minorities were eligible for being cast.

Afife's father was against a theatre career of her because he considered it unsound. For this reason, she ran away from her parents’ house. She entered as a trainee the theatre of the newly established city conservatory. The Conservatory had opened up a course to train Muslim women actresses with the rationale to play for women audience only.

Afife debuted on stage in 1920, acting as "Emel" in the theatre play "Yamalar" written by Hüseyin Suat. The role had become vacant as the Armenian Eliza Binemeciyan had gone abroad. She took the stage name Jale for this play, and was called from then on as Afife Jale. Performing at "Apollon Theatre" in Kadıköy, Afife Jale became the first ever Muslim Turkish stage actress in the country. She had to be hidden at least twice by her non-Muslim co-actors during police raids in the middle of the play. The management of the conservatory was warned of the restriction that led to her discharge from the theatre in 1921. She then  played in some other theatre companies under various stage names.

She found herself in financial trouble, and began suffering acute headache. She became addicted to morphine after her doctor applied a morphine based therapy to her.

In 1923, Mustafa Kemal, the founder of the newly proclaimed Republic, lifted the Ottoman-era ban on stage acting by Muslim women. This led to the end of Afife's fears. She joined the theatre again, and toured in Anatolia. However, her drug addiction caused the worsening of her health that ultimately led to her retirement from the theatre.

Family life
She was born in 1902 in Istanbul to Hidayet and his wife Methiye. She had a sister Behiye and a brother Salâh.

Afife Jale became impoverished after leaving her acting career. In 1928, she met Selahattin Pınar (1902–1960), a tambur virtuoso, at a Turkish classical music concert she attended. The couple married in 1929, and moved to an apartment in Fatih district of Istanbul. The marriage life did not go well, and the couple divorced in 1935 when Afife's morphine addiction affected their marriage negatively. Selahattin Pınar composed a number of musical pieces, which later became classical, referring to his relationship with her wife during their marriage.

Concerned about her substance dependence, Jale's friends from the conservatory took her to the Bakırköy Psychiatric Hospital for therapy. She spent her last years in the hospital, where she died on July 24, 1941. Her burial place was forgotten.

Legacy
In 1987, journalist Nezihe Araz (1922–2009) wrote a theatre play titled "Afife Jale", which was played on stage and turned into a film.

Afife Jale's tragic life was depicted twice in the cinema, first in the 1987 movie Afife Jale directed by Şahin Kaygun, and later in Ceyda Aslı Kılıçkıran's 2008 movie Kilit, with Müjde Ar starring in both.

Premiering in December 1998, the "Modern Dance Company" of the Turkish State Opera and Ballet performed a contemporary ballet suite Afife composed by Turgay Erdener and choreographed by Beyhan Murphy. The two-act work dramatizes Afife's life in four scenes with the colors of gold (youth), red (struggle), purple (addiction), and silver (death). The ballet was performed again in 2012 at the Süreyya Opera House in Kadıköy.

The 2000 released music album Afife contains classical music song by soprano Selva Erdener accompanied by Tchaikovsky Symphony Orchestra of Moscow Radio.

A documentary movie "Yüzyılın aşkları: Afife ve Selahattin" by Can Dündar, depicting her marriage with Selahattin Pınar, was broadcast in 2004 on the channel CNN Türk.

At the Ortaköy neighborhood of the Beşiktaş district of Istanbul, a cultural center, the "Afife Jale Kültür Merkezi", and a theatre stage, the "Afife Jale Sahnesi", are named after her.

Since 1997, the Afife Jale Theatre Award, established by the insurance company Yapı Kredi Sigorta, is given to distinguished theatre actors annually in her honor.

References

1902 births
Actresses from Istanbul
Turkish stage actresses
1941 deaths
Drug-related deaths in Turkey
20th-century Turkish actresses